The Comrades of The Great War were formed in 1917 as an association to represent the rights of ex-service men and women who had served or had been discharged from service during World War I. Comrades of The Great War was one of the original four ex-service associations that amalgamated on Sunday 15 May 1921 to form The British Legion.

The organisation was founded by John Joseph Woodward who was also secretary and Edward Stanley, 17th Earl of Derby as a right-wing alternative to the National Association of Discharged Sailors and Soldiers (NADSS) and the National Federation of Discharged and Demobilized Sailors and Soldiers (NRDSS).  In particular, the NFDSS had put a candidate up against Derby's son in the 1917 Liverpool Abercromby by-election. Historian Niall Barr has stated that the movement was intended to "form a buttress against Bolshevism": its leader, Conservative Party MP Wilfrid Ashley was also secretary of the Anti-Socialist Union.

References

External links 
British Legion Memorabilia Collectors Club - Comrades of the Great War Badges
Badge Exhibition at the Royal British Legion in North Staffordshire's On-Line Museum
Badge
Badge
Unity Badges of the Founding Associations
History of the association in Bures, Suffolk

Clubs
Comrades of the Great War Club, Coulsdon Club History - 27 June 1919
Comrades [of the Great War] Club, Godmanchester History 1920 - 1929
Ballyclare Comrades Football Club

British veterans' organisations
Defunct organisations based in the United Kingdom
United Kingdom in World War I
1917 establishments in the United Kingdom
1921 disestablishments in the United Kingdom
Organizations established in 1917
Organizations disestablished in 1921